This is a comprehensive listing of official releases by Calle 13, a Puerto Rican urban music duo.

Albums

Singles

Featured singles

Music videos

See also
Residente discography

Notes

References

Reggaeton discographies
Discographies of Puerto Rican artists
Discography